Richard Earl Adkins (March 3, 1920 – September 12, 1955) was a professional baseball player.  He was a shortstop for one season (1942) with the Philadelphia Athletics.  For his career, he compiled a .143 batting average in 7 at-bats.

He was born and later died in Electra, Texas at the age of 35 after a short battle with cancer.

References

External links

1920 births
1955 deaths
Philadelphia Athletics players
Major League Baseball shortstops
Baseball players from Texas
Wilmington Blue Rocks (1940–1952) players
Birmingham Barons players
Natchez Indians players
People from Electra, Texas
Deaths from cancer in Texas
Clovis Pioneers players
Newport News Pilots players
Minor league baseball managers